Şekip Engineri (1902 – 12 January 1979) was a Turkish sprinter. He competed in the men's 100 metres event at the 1924 Summer Olympics. He was also a prominent politician, Member of Parliament, and a member of the CHP.

References

External links
 

1902 births
1979 deaths
Athletes (track and field) at the 1924 Summer Olympics
Turkish male sprinters
Olympic athletes of Turkey
Republican People's Party (Turkey) politicians